Irina Borisovna Strakhova; born 4 March 1959 in Novosibirsk) is a race walker who represented the Soviet Union.

Achievements

External links 

1959 births
Living people
Sportspeople from Novosibirsk
Russian female racewalkers
Soviet female racewalkers
World Athletics Championships athletes for the Soviet Union
World Athletics Championships medalists
World Athletics Race Walking Team Championships winners
World Athletics Championships winners
20th-century Russian women